James Mefford Hanks (born June 15, 1961) is an American actor and filmmaker. He has played numerous minor roles in film and guest appearances on television, and often does voice substitution work for his older brother Tom Hanks (most notably Sheriff Woody for Toy Story-related talking toys and video games). He has produced, directed, and filmed several short films. Hanks made his film debut in Buford's Beach Bunnies (1993).

Early life
James Mefford Hanks was born in Shasta County, California on June 15, 1961. He is the son of Janet Marylyn (née Frager) and itinerant cook Amos Mefford Hanks. Hanks is also the youngest brother of fellow actor Tom Hanks and entomologist Larry Hanks, but they were not raised together. After their parents divorced, Jim went to Red Bluff, California with his mother while older siblings Tom, Larry, and Sandra remained with their father. After college, he lived in Sacramento working as a waiter. The agent who employed his actress wife Karen Praxel as a receptionist encouraged him to get into acting. After he took acting lessons, he moved to Los Angeles in 1992 and began his career with roles in B-movies and commercial voice-overs.

Career
He got his first lead role as Jeeter Buford in Buford's Beach Bunnies (1993). Wishing to earn the role based on his own abilities, he auditioned as "Jim Matthews" (just his first and a modification of his middle name). While producers noted his "resemblance to Tom Hanks", he won the role based on his own comedic and acting skills and his relationship to his brother was not revealed until paperwork was completed.

In 1995, A Current Affair revealed that Tom had created the mannerisms for the character of Forrest Gump based on the simpleton mannerisms earlier created by Jim for the role of Jeeter, including Forrest's "now-famous jerky run". His physical resemblance to his brother allowed him to act as body double for him in scenes in Forrest Gump. Due to his vocal similarity, and with his brother Tom's personal recommendation, he often substitutes for Tom in the role of Sheriff Woody in various Toy Story video games and spin-offs.

Hanks began to provide the voice of Geoffrey the Giraffe in the Toys "R" Us commercials in 2001 and is the voice of Rudy from the Red Robin Gourmet Burgers commercials.

He guest-starred in an episode of Scrubs, appearing as a "Dr. Turner" partnered with a doctor called "Hooch" (in reference to his brother's film Turner & Hooch).

In the 1998 film adaptation of O. Henry's "The Ransom of Red Chief", Hanks played the role of the mailman who was the town gossip.

He has appeared on stage, including playing "Lennie Small" in Theatrical Arts International's production of John Steinbeck's Of Mice and Men.

In November 2016, Hanks guest-starred in a web series called Gary CK Needs Work, a parody of the FX show Louie.

Personal life
Hanks married actress Karen Praxel on May 25, 1986, together they have one son. The family resides in Venice, California.

He works with Los Angeles-based "Feet First Films", a production company that provides actor demos as well as production support for short films.

Filmography

Film

Television

Video games

Theme parks

Filmmaking credits

Awards and nominations

References

External links
 
 

Tom Hanks
Living people
Male actors from California
American male film actors
American male radio actors
American male television actors
American male voice actors
American male video game actors
People from Shasta County, California
People from Venice, Los Angeles
1961 births